Choad may refer to:
 Titled works:
 "Choad", song by Dead Hot Workshop
 "Choad", song from Harshing My Mellow by Bewitched
 Slang terms:
 For penis
 For perineum

See also
Chode, or Kyoad, a language of Ghana